Victor Earl Mark (1876–1948) was an architect in Jacksonville, Florida, United States.

References

1876 births
1948 deaths
Architects from Jacksonville, Florida
Architects from Florida